Hans Estner (born 7 April 1951 in Tegernsee) is a West German former biathlete who competed in the 1980 Winter Olympics where he won a bronze medal in the 4x7.5 km relay.

References

1951 births
Living people
German male biathletes
Olympic biathletes of West Germany
Biathletes at the 1980 Winter Olympics
Olympic bronze medalists for West Germany
Olympic medalists in biathlon
Medalists at the 1980 Winter Olympics